Choi Youn-ah (born 24 October 1985) is a South Korean Former basketball player and Current a Coach of Busan BNK Sum. who competed in the 2008 Summer Olympics.

References

External links

1985 births
Living people
South Korean women's basketball players
Olympic basketball players of South Korea
Basketball players at the 2008 Summer Olympics
Sportspeople from Daejeon
Basketball players at the 2006 Asian Games
Asian Games competitors for South Korea